The Seven-Ups is a 1973 American neo-noir mystery action film produced and directed by Philip D'Antoni.  It stars Roy Scheider as a crusading policeman who is the leader of the Seven-Ups, a squad of plainclothes officers who use dirty, unorthodox tactics to snare their quarry on charges leading to prison sentences of seven years or more upon prosecution, hence the name of the team.

D'Antoni took his sole directing credit on this film. He was earlier responsible for producing the action thriller Bullitt, followed by The French Connection, which won him the 1971 Academy Award for Best Picture. All three feature a memorable car chase sequence.

Several other people who worked on The French Connection were also involved in this film, such as Scheider, screenwriter and police technical advisor Sonny Grosso, composer Don Ellis, and stunt coordinator Bill Hickman. 20th Century Fox was again the distributor.

Buddy Manucci, played by Scheider, is a loose remake of the character of Buddy "Cloudy" Russo he played in The French Connection, a character who also used dirty tactics to capture his enemies, and who was also based on Sonny Grosso.

Plot
NYPD detective Buddy Manucci has been under pressure from the senior officers in the New York City police force because his team of renegade policemen, known as the "seven-ups" (so called because most criminals they arrest receive sentences from seven years and up) have been using unorthodox methods to arrest criminals; this is illustrated as the team ransacks an antiques store that is a front for the running of counterfeit money. In addition, there have been a rash of kidnappings of organized crime figures and white-collar criminals. Max Kalish is kidnapped and a ransom is paid at a car wash.

Manucci and the squad learn of the kidnappings when crooked bail bondsman Festa is grabbed in public by two men claiming to be from the district attorney's office. Buddy gets information from his regular snitch, informant Vito Lucia, who turns out to be untrustworthy. When they stake out a funeral meeting of Kalish and his people, disaster follows, and it leads to the death of one of the seven-up officers.  A violent car chase ensues as Buddy chases after the killers, Moon and Bo, and other officers attempt to block the two at the George Washington Bridge but Moon and Bo crash through the police barricade then escape when Buddy's car violently collides into a truck, shearing off the roof. Miraculously, he survives the almost fatal accident.

Manucci figures out the puzzle after the squad and he break into the house of Kalish  and his wife and confront them at gunpoint.  The squad and he then must stake out the house of a garage worker who knows too much, to smoke out the killers.

Cast
 Roy Scheider as Detective Buddy Mannuci
 Tony Lo Bianco as Vito Lucia 
 Larry Haines as Max Kalish 
 Richard Lynch as Moon 
 Bill Hickman as Bo 
 Jerry Leon as Mingo
 Victor Arnold as Barilli 
 Ken Kercheval as Ansel 
 Lou Polan as Carmine Coltello 
 Matt Russo as Festa
 Joe Spinell as Toredano
 Robert Burr as Lieutenant Hanes
 Rex Everhart as Inspector Gilson
 David Wilson as Bobby 
 Ed Jordan as Bruno 
 Mary Multari as Mrs Pugliese 
 Frank Mascetta as Barber
 Frances Chaney as Sara Kalish 
 Mike Treanor as Policeman 
 Benny Marino as Festa's Son
 Bill Funaro as Big Bill
 Billy Longo as Mobster #1
 Ace Alagna as Mobster #2
 Sheldon Adler as Doctor 
 Adeline Leonard as Nurse
 Edward Carey as Police Commissioner

Production
The film was announced in July 1971. Canadian TV writer Philip Hersch was hired by producer Phil d'Antoni to write the script based on the real life exploits of Sonny Grosso and Eddie Egan. While making The French Connection, Grosso told d'Antoni the story of "the kidnapping of mobsters by cops who weren't really cops," said the producer. "A very weird and fascinating story." It was about a group of police in the 1950s who were only assigned felonies where the penalties were seven years and up.

The French Connection was a big box-office success and 20th Century Fox agreed to let D'Antoni direct. "We kind of agreed the best one to direct this would be me," he said.

Filming locations
Filming locations include Manhattan, Brooklyn, New Jersey, Westchester County, and the Bronx.

Festa's abduction takes place in Brooklyn, across from the old courthouse on Court and Montague Streets near Cadman Plaza. Buddy makes his rounds in and around Arthur Avenue and the Arthur Avenue Retail Market in the Bronx.

Vito pays off Moon at the New York Botanical Garden. Buddy and Vito meet at the track field between De Witt Clinton High School and Bronx High School of Science, and object to the new Tracey Towers housing project looming in the background. Kalish's house is at W. 246th Street and Fieldston Road in Riverdale.

The funeral-home sequence where Ansel is abducted was filmed at the side entrance to Lucia Brothers Funeral Home on the corner of E. 184th and Hoffman Streets. Buddy and his partner are staking out the funeral home from an upstairs apartment across the street, in a building located at 2324 Hoffman Street. In the background, one can see the elevated IRT Third Avenue Line of the New York City Subway, which was dismantled shortly after this movie was filmed. Aside from the Third Avenue Line and the fact that the one-way vehicle traffic on Hoffman Street has since been reversed, the locations remain today for the most part as they did in the movie. The funeral procession then rides on Pelham Parkway.

The climactic shootout scene at the end of the movie was filmed in areas just outside Co-op City's Section Five, at what today is Erskine Place, between De Reimer and Palmer Avenues.

Chase scene
Similar than the two films in Bullitt and The French Connection, Philip D'Antoni again used stunt coordinator and driver Bill Hickman (who also has a small role in the film) to help create the chase sequence for this film. Filmed in and around Upper Manhattan, New York City, the sequence was edited by Gerald B. Greenberg (credited as Jerry Greenberg), who also has an associate producer credit on this film and who won an Academy Award for his editing work on The French Connection.

In the chase sequence, which occurs near the middle of the film, Hickman's car is being chased by Scheider. The chase itself borrows heavily from the Bullitt chase, with the two cars bouncing down the gradients of uptown New York (like the cars on San Francisco's steep hills in the earlier film) with Hickman's 1973 Pontiac Grand Ville sedan pursued by Scheider's 1973 Pontiac Ventura coupe. While Scheider did some of his own driving, most of it was done by Hollywood stunt man Jerry Summers.

Location shooting for the chase scene was done in the Upper West Side, including West 96th Street, on the George Washington Bridge, and on New Jersey's Palisades Interstate Parkway and New York's Taconic State Parkway and New York's Saw Mill River Parkway

In the accompanying behind-the-scenes featurette of the 2006 DVD release of the film, Hickman can be seen co-ordinating, from the street, a chase scene wherein a stuntman in a parked car opens his door as Hickman's vehicle takes it off its hinges. The end of the chase was Hickman's homage to the death of Jayne Mansfield, where Scheider's car (driven by Summers) smashes into the back of a parked tractor-trailer, shearing off most of the top portion of the car.

See also
 List of American films of 1973

References

External links
 
 
 
 

1970s chase films
1970s crime action films
1973 films
American crime action films
American chase films
Fictional portrayals of the New York City Police Department
Films about the New York City Police Department
Films set in New York City
Films shot in New York City
American police detective films
Films scored by Don Ellis
1973 directorial debut films
1970s English-language films
1970s American films